Stradzewo may refer to the following places:
Stradzewo, Lubusz Voivodeship (west Poland)
Stradzewo, Masovian Voivodeship (east-central Poland)
Stradzewo, West Pomeranian Voivodeship (north-west Poland)